Satellite navigation software or GPS navigation software usually falls into one of the following two categories:
 Navigation with route calculation and directions from the software to the user of the route to take, based on a vector-based map, normally for motorized vehicles with some motorized forms added on as an afterthought.
 Navigation tracking, often with a map "picture" in the background, but showing where you have been, and allowing "routes" to be preprogrammed, giving a line you can follow on the screen. This type can also be used for geocaching.

Terminology

Track 
A track is a trace of somewhere that you have actually been (often called a "breadcrumb trail").  The GPS unit (external or internal) periodically sends details of the location which are recorded by the software, either by taking a reading based on a set time interval, based on a set distance, based on a change in direction by more than a certain angle, or a combination of these. Each point is stored together with its date and time. The resulting track can be displayed as a series of the recorded points or a line connecting them.

Retracing your steps is a simple matter of following the track back to the source.

Route 
A route is a preset series of points that make up a set route to follow for your destination. Most software allows the route and the track to be displayed at the same time.

Waypoint 
Waypoints are used to mark particular locations, typically used as markers along the "way" to somewhere. They are either key entered by users or downloaded from other sources, depending upon the sophistication of the device. Although not linked to tracks or routes, they can be used to simplify the construction of routes, by being able to be re-used. Frequently, waypoints serve a "safety" purpose, enabling a route to be taken around obstacles such as shallow water (marine navigation) or streams/cliffs/other hazards which may prevent a safe passage directly from point "A" to point "B".

Platforms 

Software can be used on a laptop computer with an attached GPS receiver. Most commercial software runs on Windows, Mac OS X, and Linux.
Some software like Waze and Google Maps can also be used on mobile phone operating systems.

Software products
There are several navigation software products available. The primary distinction is whether it is designed for use on land or water.

Land-based navigation software 

Commercial navigation software with embedded maps
 DeLorme Street Atlas USA and Topo USA
 HERE
 Microsoft Streets and Trips (discontinued in 2014)
 Rand McNally
 Navigon
 Navman
 Magellan
 Mireo
 iGO
 ROUTE 66
 TomTom Navigator
 TomTom Mobile
 TeleType WorldNavigator
 TPL Maps 
 Waze

Commercial navigation software with scanned or downloaded maps and orthophotos stored in the computer (independent, stand alone system)
 OziExplorer
 GPSS

Free open source navigation software (independent stand alone system)
 OsmAnd (Android) open source, and free
 MoNav (Cross-platform) open source and free
 Navit (Cross-platform) open source and free

Navigation software with maps downloaded from a remote server
 Google Earth (Windows, Mac, Linux)
 Google Maps (platform independent)
 Mapy.cz (Cross-platform) free
 Navit (Cross-platform) open source and free

Marine navigation software 
Navigation software for use on the water has many features in common with land-based GPS navigation software. It can use electronic navigation chart or raster charts, usually provides user ability to plan routes and set waypoints, and may have live GPS tracking capabilities. In addition, marine navigation software often has option to control external autopilot for automated boat navigation. It may incorporate GRIB weather overlay on the chart, Tide predictions and other related information services of additional use to mariners.

Free open source marine navigation software
 OpenCPN (Cross-platform) open source and free

Aeronautical navigation software 
This kind of software usually creates a modern glass cockpit and uses more than just a single GPS sensor to assist the navigation. Such sensors are Attitude and Heading Reference Systems (AHRS) and Inertial Measurement Unit (IMU) sensors.

See also
 Comparison of free off-line GPS software
 Comparison of commercial GPS software
 Comparison of web map services
 Geopositioning
 GPS software-defined receiver
 Wayfinding software

References

 
Transport software
Global Positioning System